The Wacky Adventures of Ronald McDonald is an American animated miniseries of retail direct-to-video episodes produced by Klasky Csupo in association with the McDonald's Corporation, centering on McDonald's mascot Ronald McDonald and the gang in McDonaldland. A total of six 40-minute episodes were produced and released on VHS with five of them being available exclusively in participating McDonald's restaurants from October 9, 1998 to January 30, 2003.

Production
Mark and Bob Mothersbaugh (best known as members of the band Devo and composers of the music for Rugrats, another Klasky Csupo series) composed the score of the series while John Holmquist (who has also directed some Rugrats episodes) directed the first episode of the series. The artistic style of the series has a similar look to Rugrats, Aaahh!!! Real Monsters, The Wild Thornberrys, and Rocket Power (another Klasky Csupo series). The background music was recycled from later episodes of Nickelodeon's Rugrats.

In a format similar to both The New 3 Stooges, The Super Mario Bros. Super Show! and Back to the Future: The Animated Series, each episode starts and ends with a live-action segment.

By various accounts, the episodes turned out to be rather popular, to which individual McDonald's locations frequently ran out of VHS tapes, which were sold individually for $3.49 and could be bought with a small vanilla ice cream cone or Diet Coke. Klasky Csupo also sold them through their online gift shop, which was shut down in fall 2005.

A Happy Meal featuring Lego vehicles to build was released at the restaurant chain in 1999, a year after the series originally premiered. The front of each vehicle had an image of one of the McDonaldland characters in the Klasky Csupo style, as depicted in the series.

Cast

Main
Voice talent on the series includes K-C veterans Christine Cavanaugh, Kath Soucie, and Charlie Adler. The role of Ronald McDonald is credited as "Himself."
 Jack Doepke (ep. 1–3) and David Hussey (ep. 4–6) as Ronald McDonald
 Charlie Adler as Hamburglar, McNugget #3, McSplorer
 Pamela Adlon as McNugget #1
 Dee Bradley Baker as Sundae (voice) (ep. 1-6), TV Monitor, Squirrel, Sea Monster
 Kevin Michael Richardson as Grimace, King Gunga
 Christine Cavanaugh as Birdie the Early Bird
 Jazmine A. Corona as Tika
 Jim Cummings as Announcer
 Nika Futterman as Fry Kid #3
 Paul Greenberg as Fry Kid #2
 Alex D. Linz as Franklin
 Lisa Raggio as McNugget #2
 Kath Soucie as Fry Kid #1
 Verne Troyer as Sundae (in a suit) (ep. 1-3)

Guest cast
 Jeff Bennett as TV Man, Knight #1
 Gregg Berger as Barber, Fat Man, Foodfight Walla
 Corey Burton as Bug, Mob Man #1
 David Eccles as Bear
 Bill Farmer as Knight #2, Mob Leader
 Henry Gibson as Blue Planet
 Kim Mai Guest as Kids
 Billie Hayes as One-Eyed Sally
 Bob Joles as Mayor McCheese, Mob Man #2, Knight
 Carol Kane as Org's Mom 
 Maurice LaMarche as Dr. Quizzical, Burger Chef, Knight
 Jeff Lupetin as Iam Hungry
 Euan MacDonald as Simon
 Mona Marshall as Kids
 Drew Massey as Pip
 Julie Merrill as TV Woman
 Richard Moll as Org's Dad
 Patrick Pinney as Phantom Head
 Phil Snyder as Professor Thaddeus J. Pinchworm, Stiles
 Warren Sroka as King Murray
 Andre Stojka as Royal Chef
 Tara Strong as Girl, Boy, Sheep
 Meshach Taylor as Pink Planet
 James Kevin Ward as Scotty
 Gedde Watanabe as Karate Master
 Bruce Weitz as Blather
 Julian West as Dad, Police Officer
 Carl W. Wolfe as Org

Episodes

Crew
 Charlie Adler – Voice Director
 Barbara Wright – Casting Director
 Terry Thoren – Executive In Charge of Production
 Tracy Kramer – Executive In Charge of Production
 Glenwood Editorial, Inc. – Track Reading
 Grimsaem Animation – Overseas Production Facility
 Sunwoo Entertainment – Overseas Production Facility

References

External links
 
 
 
 
 
 

McDonald's advertising
1990s American animated television series
2000s American animated television series
1990s American television miniseries
2000s American television miniseries
1998 American television series debuts
2003 American television series endings
American television series with live action and animation
American children's animated adventure television series
American children's animated comedy television series
American children's animated fantasy television series
American children's animated musical television series
American television shows featuring puppetry
Direct-to-video animated films
Direct-to-video television series
Television series by Klasky Csupo